The Kenton Post Office is a historic post office building on Maine Street in Kenton, Delaware.  It is a two-story Italianate building that was built in 1881 by Francis Greenwell.  It was leased out by Greenwell as a store, with a residence above, until the early 20th century when the post office took over the space.

The building was listed on the National Register of Historic Places in 1983.

See also 

National Register of Historic Places listings in Kent County, Delaware

List of United States post offices

References 

Italianate architecture in Delaware
Government buildings completed in 1881
Buildings and structures in Kent County, Delaware
Kenton, Delaware
Post office buildings on the National Register of Historic Places in Delaware
National Register of Historic Places in Kent County, Delaware
1881 establishments in Delaware